Chubanluy, also known as Chupanlu, may refer to:
 Chubanluy-e Olya, a village in Lakestan Rural District, Iran
 Chubanluy-e Sofla, a village in Lakestan Rural District, Iran
 Chabinlu, a village in Sarajuy-ye Sharqi Rural District, Iran
 Chobanlu, an abandoned village in the Syunik Province of Armenia